Yaakov Chaim Sofer (1870–1939) (Hebrew: יעקב חיים סופר) was a Sephardi rabbi, Kabbalist, Talmudist and posek. He is the author of Kaf Hachaim, a work of halakha that he came to be known by.

Biography
Sofer was born in Baghdad, Ottoman Iraq. He studied the Torah under Abdallah Somekh and the Ben Ish Hai. In 1904, he journeyed to Ottoman Palestine together with colleagues Sadqa Hussein and the Asei HaYa'ar in order to meet with the Rishon LeZion, known as the Yisa Berakha, and to pray at the graves of the righteous. After visiting Jerusalem, he decided to settle there permanently. He studied in the Bet El yeshiva in the Old City of Jerusalem, well known for the study of kabbalah. In 1909 he moved to the newly founded Shoshanim leDavid yeshiva. It was here that he composed his works.

Sofer authored several works of halakha and aggadah. His books are known for discussing the original traditions of Iraqi Jews.

Works
In Kaf Hachaim (כף החיים),  Sofer discusses the halakha in light of the Rishonim and Acharonim. Kaf Hachaim, usually published in ten volumes, covers Orach Chayim (8 vol.) and parts of Yoreh De'ah (2 vol.). It is often compared to the Mishnah Berurah in terms of scope and approach, but differs in its more extensive reliance upon quotations.  This work also surveys the views of many kabbalistic sages (particularly Isaac Luria), when these impact the Halakha. Shinun Halacha is a work summarising the Halakhic conclusions presented in Kaf Hachaim.

In addition to the Kaf Hachaim, Sofer  authored:
 Kol Yaakov: on the laws of writing torah scrolls, tefillin, and mezuzot, as well as on the tefillin in general
 Yagel Yaakov: a compendium of Shabbat drashot (sermons) delivered while in mourning for his father
 Yismach Yisrael: novellae on the parsha, the weekly Torah reading.
 Chayim Ad Haolam on the aggadah of the Talmud

References

External links
 Kaf haChaim Vol 1 (Hebrew)

1870 births
1939 deaths
20th-century rabbis in Jerusalem
Burials at the Jewish cemetery on the Mount of Olives
Iraqi Jews
Kabbalists
Sephardi rabbis in Ottoman Palestine
Iraqi emigrants to Mandatory Palestine
Authors of books on Jewish law